Vanadium phosphates are inorganic compounds with the formula VOxPO4 as well related hydrates with the formula VOxPO4(H2O)n. Some of these compounds are used commercially as catalysts for oxidation reactions.

Vanadium(V) phosphates 
A common vanadium phosphate is VOPO4•2H2O. 

Seven polymorphs are known for anhydrous VOPO4, denoted αI, αII, β, γ, δ, ω, and ε. These materials are composed of the vanadyl group (VO) and phosphate (PO43−). They are yellow, diamagnetic solids, although when contaminated with vanadium(IV) derivatives, samples exhibit EPR signals and have bluish cast. For these materials, vanadyl refers to both vanadium(V) oxo and vanadium(IV) oxo centers, although conventionally vanadyl is reserved for derivatives of VO2+.

Preparation, reactions, and applications of VOPO4•2H2O 
Heating a suspension of vanadium pentoxide and phosphoric acid gives VOPO4•2H2O, isolated as a bright yellow solid. According to X-ray crystallography, the V(V) centers are octahedral, with long, weak bonds to aquo ligands.

Reduction of this compound with alcohols gives the vanadium(IV) phosphates.

These compounds are catalysts for the oxidation of butane to maleic anhydride. A key step in the activation of these catalysts is the conversion of VO(HPO4)•0.5H2O to the pyrophosphate (VO)2(P2O7). This material (CAS#58834-75-6) is called vanadyl pyrophosphate as well as vanadium oxide pyrophosphate.

Vanadium(IV) phosphates 
Several vanadium(IV) phosphates are known. These materials are typically blue. In these species, the phosphate anion is singly or doubly protonated. Examples include the hydrogenphosphates, VOHPO4.4H2O and VO(HPO4).0.5H2O, as well as the dihydrogen phosphate VO(H2PO4)2.

Vanadium(III) phosphates 
Vanadium(III) phosphates lacking the oxo ligand have the formula VPO4•H2O and VPO4•2H2O. The monohydrate is isostructural with MgSO4•H2O  It adopts the structure of the corresponding hydrated aluminium phosphate. Oxidation of VPO4•H2O yields the two-electron electroactive material ε-VOPO4

Notes

References 

Vanadium compounds
Catalysts
Phosphates